Legislative elections were held in Mongolia on 2 July 2000. The result was a victory for the Mongolian People's Revolutionary Party, which won 72 of the 76 seats in the State Great Khural. Voter turnout was 82.4%.

Results

References

Mongolia
2000 in Mongolia
Elections in Mongolia
Election and referendum articles with incomplete results